Unión Deportiva Melilla was a Spanish football team based in the autonomous city of Melilla. Founded in 1943 and dissolved in 1956, it played for four consecutive seasons in Segunda División.

History
At the beginning of the 1930s, Melilla city had four local football teams: Melilla C.F., Sociedad Deportiva Melillense, Deportivo Español and La Hípica. Unión Deportiva Melilla was founded on 6 February 1943. The first official game was against C.D. African on 21 March 1943. UD Melilla won it 5:1.

The club reached Tercera División after only one year of existence, and in 1950, achieved promotion to Segunda División. They suffered relegation in 1954, and folded two years later. Melilla CF took their place.

Club background
Juventud Español — (1940–43)
Melilla Fútbol Club — (1921–43)
Unión Deportiva Melilla — (1943–56)
Club Deportivo Tesorillo — (1940–56)
Melilla Club de Fútbol – (1956–76)
Club Gimnástico de Cabrerizas – (1973–76)
Sociedad Deportiva Melilla – (1970–76)
Gimnástico Melilla Club de Fútbol – (1976–80)
Unión Deportiva Melilla – (1980–)

Other clubs from Melilla
Club Deportivo Real Melilla — (1939–)
Club de Fútbol Melilla Industrial – (1968–74)
Club de Fútbol Industrial Melilla – (1975–85)
Melilla Fútbol Club — (1985–91)

Season to season

4 seasons in Segunda División
8 seasons in Tercera División

References

 
Football clubs in Melilla
Association football clubs established in 1943
Association football clubs disestablished in 1956
1943 establishments in Spain
1956 establishments in Spain
Segunda División clubs